"Stop, Look, Listen" is a song by MC Lyte with DJ K-Rock, released as the second single from Lyte's second album Eyes on This. It was published on February 1, 1990. In its single version it is an Audio Two remix of the original version of the LP produced by King of Chill.

The song is built around a sample of Ecstasy, Passion & Pain's "Born to Lose You". Also samples Lyte herself in earlier songs like "Survival of the Fittest" and "Lyte Thee Mc".

Appearances
It was later included on the compilation albums The Very Best of MC Lyte (2001), The Shit I Never Dropped (2003), and Cold Rock a Party – Best of MC Lyte (2019). Her music video was included on her compilation video album Lyte Years (1991). The single has also been reissued in 2004.

Later was sampled by herself in her song with Pamela Long of the group Total "Too Fly" from her sixth album Seven & Seven (1998). It was also sampled in songs by others artists like Wreckx-n-Effect's "Rump Shaker",  Mary J. Blige's "Reminisce" and Gang Starr with J. Cole's "Family & Loyalty".

Single track listing

12" Vinyl

A-Side
 "Stop, Look, Listen" (Remix) (6:05)
Produced by Audio Two

B-Side
 Stop, Look, Listen (Remix Instrumental)" (3:29)
Produced by Audio Two
 "Stop, Look, Listen (LP Version)" (3:16)
 "Start It Up Y'all" (Audio Two feat. MC Lyte and Positive K) (5:12)

Cassette

A-1
 "Stop, Look, Listen" (Remix) (6:05)

A-2
 "Start It Up Y'all" (5:12)

Personnel
Credits are taken from the liner notes.
Lyrics By – Gizmo (tracks: B3), MC Lyte, Milk Dee (tracks: B3), Positive K (tracks: B3), King Of Chill
Mastered By – Dennis King (D.K.)
Music By – Gizmo, Milk Dee, King Of Chill (tracks: A, B1 & B2)
Executive-Producer – Nat Robinson

Charts

References

MC Lyte songs
1989 singles
1989 songs
Atlantic Records singles
Songs written by MC Lyte